This is a list of current and former Roman Catholic churches in the Roman Catholic Diocese of London, Ontario. The diocese includes 115 churches in Southwestern Ontario divided into seven administrative regions called deaneries. The cathedral church of the diocese is St. Peter's Cathedral Basilica in London, Ontario.

Essex Deanery

Huron Perth Deanery

Ingersoll Deanery

Kent Deanery

London Deanery

Sarnia Deanery

Windsor Deanery

Former Churches

References

Lists of churches in Canada